A season is one of the major divisions of the year.

Season(s) or The Season may also refer to:

Periods of the year 
 Season (society) or social season, the portion of the year when the social elite hold events
 Season (sports), the portion of the year when games are played
 Breeding season, a time of year most favorable for wild animal or bird breeding
 Estrus, a period in the estrous cycle of mammals when female seasonal breeders are receptive to mating
 Christmas and holiday season, an annual festive season surrounding Christmas and New Year's Day
 Growing season, in agriculture, the period of the year when crops can be grown
 Hunting season, times of year when it is legal to hunt specific types of animals
 Liturgical season, in Christian churches, a portion of the liturgical year
 Seasonal food, the time of year when a given type food is at its peak

Places
 Seasons, a house in Round Maple, Suffolk, England

Arts, entertainment, and media

Films 
 Season (film), a 1989 Malayalam feature film
 Seasons (film), a 2015 French film
 Seasons, an Omnimax film produced by the Science Museum of Minnesota
 The Season, a sports documentary about a high school football team coached by Mike Pettine

Literature
 The Season: A Candid Look at Broadway, a 1969 book by William Goldman
 The Season, a 2009 young-adult novel by Sarah MacLean

Music 
 Season (band), an English rock band from Birmingham

Albums 
 Seasons (Alan Silva album), 1971
 Seasons (Bing Crosby album) or the title song, 1977
 Seasons (David Murray album) or the title song, 1999
 Seasons (Levi the Poet album), 2012
 Seasons (The Oak Ridge Boys album) or the title song, 1986
 Seasons (Pete Jolly album) or the title song, 1970
 Seasons (Sevendust album) or the title song, 2003
 Seasons (Sylar album) or the title song, 2018
 Seasons (The Verses album), 2010
 Seasons (EP) or the title song, by Tiger Please, 2010
 Seasons, by Chris August, 2018
 Seasons, by CoH, 2002
 Seasons, by Magna Carta, 1970
 The Season (Steve Perry album), 2021
 The Season, by Jane Monheit, 2005

Songs 
 "Seasons" (Ayumi Hamasaki song), 2000
 "Seasons" (Jin Akanishi song), 2011
 "Seasons" (Olly Murs song), 2015
 "Seasons" (The Veer Union song), 2009
 "Seasons (Waiting on You)", by Future Islands, 2014
 "Seasons", by 6lack from East Atlanta Love Letter, 2018
 "Seasons", by Chris Cornell from Singles: Original Motion Picture Soundtrack, 1992
 "Seasons", by CunninLynguists from SouthernUnderground, 2003
 "Seasons", by DragonForce from The Power Within, 2012
 "Seasons", by Grace Slick from Dreams, 1980
 "Seasons", by Maroon 5 from Jordi, 2021
 "Seasons", by Mozzy, Sjava and Reason from the Black Panther soundtrack, 2018
 "Seasons", by T.I. from Dime Trap, 2018

Television
 Season (North America) or series (UK), a cycle or set of episodes of a television show
 Justin Bieber: Seasons, a 2020 American documentary series

Video games 
 Season (video gaming), a definite set of special content in a video game
 The Sims 2: Seasons, a 2007 expansion pack to the computer game The Sims 2
 The Sims 3: Seasons, a 2012 expansion pack to the computer game The Sims 3
 The Sims 4: Seasons, a 2018 expansion pack to the computer game The Sims 4

Other uses
 Silly season, a period typified by the emergence of frivolous news stories in the media
 Season ticket, informally abbreviated "season"
 The Hunting Season, a period during the British Mandate over Palestine
 Afghanistan fighting season, an annual period with advantageous conditions for warfare in Afghanistan

See also 
 
 Seasoning (disambiguation)
 The Four Seasons (disambiguation)
 The Seasons (disambiguation)
 "SZNS", a song by Dinah Jane